Pahal Singh Lama (Nepali: पहल सिंह लामा) was the chief of Nepal Police in the mid 1960s. He is well known for his contribution in establishment of the Mahendra Police Club in 1966 A.D. (2023 BS) with the help of the then S.P. Khadgajeet Baral, Harka Bahadur Thapa and the then DIGP Rom Bahadur Thapa, during his tenure as IGP.
 
Pahal Singh Lama had been appointed Consul General (1967-1971) of Calcutta, India by His Majesty's Government after his retirement from Nepal Police.

References

Living people
Year of birth missing (living people)
Nepalese police officers
Chiefs of police
Inspectors General of Police (Nepal)